"The One -Crash to Create-" is the fifteenth single by the Japanese rock band Luna Sea, released on March 21, 2012. It is their first single since reuniting in 2010 and their first since "Love Song", which was released over 11 years earlier. It debuted at number five on the Oricon Singles Chart and reached number 23 on Billboard Japans Japan Hot 100.

Overview
Sugizo believes that it was because they were able to complete the challenging and "grand" "The One - Crash to Create", that Luna Sea was able to create its follow-up and "unquestionable rock 'n roll" songs "The End of the Dream" and "Rouge". He also said that the track had a big influence on the band's first album in 13 years, A Will.

The single debuted at number five on the Oricon Singles Chart, selling close to 24,000 copies in its first week, and charted for seven weeks. It reached number 23 on Billboard Japans Japan Hot 100. It consists solely of the 23 minute title track. Four editions were released, each with a different cover; a normal CD, a HQCD, a Hybrid SACD, and a set including all three and a DVD.

On March 8, the band held an event titled Full Moon Contact "The One" at United Cinemas Toyosu, where they played the song for the first time.It was streamed live worldwide on Nico Nico Live and Ustream. The song was then released exclusively on Luna Sea Mobile on March 14, before its general release. The first actual live performance of the song was for the special pay-per-view program Luna Sea TV Special -The End of the Dream-, which was broadcast on WOWOW on July 8, 2012, when the band performed without an audience.

Track listing
Written and composed by Luna Sea.
"The One -Crash to Create-" - 22:56Composed by J, Sugizo and Inoran. Written mainly by Ryuichi.

Personnel
Luna Sea
Ryuichi – vocals
Sugizo – guitar, violin
Inoran – guitar
J – bass guitar
Shinya – drums, percussion

Other
d-kiku – manipulator
Takuya Hayama – piano
Tomoyuki Asakawa – harp
Yucca – backing vocals
Chiyomitsu Noguchi – strings
Ikuro Fujiwara – strings conductor

References

Luna Sea songs
2012 singles
Avex Group singles
2012 songs